"The Big Crash" is a song by American rock singer Eddie Money, from his album Where's the Party? in 1983 (see 1983 in music). It was released as a single and reached #54 on the Billboard Hot 100 and #17 on the Mainstream Rock chart.

Chart performance

References 

1983 singles
Eddie Money songs
1983 songs
Columbia Records singles
Songs written by Eddie Money
Songs written by Duane Hitchings